Jackie Vanjari has been working as a music producer in the Hindi film industry for the past 35 years.

Life and early career
He started his career with the legendary icon R.D Burman, and worked with him on projects such as Ijaazat, Parinda, Ghatak, Drohi, Gurudev, Sarphira, Jhoothi Shaan, Siyasat, 1942: Love Story, Indrajeet and Gardish from 1987. Over the years he has worked with Top Music Composers such as Jatin-Lalit for Dil Wale Dulania, Vishal Bharadwaj Nusrat Fateh Ali Khan, Anu Malik, Pritam, Vishal-Shekhar  and few others for movies such as, Aśoka, Yaadein, Om Jai Jagdish, Khushi, Awara Paagal Deewana, Om Shanti Om, Golmaal, Jab we Met, Dhol, Tashan, Kites, Ta ra rum pum, Dostana, Aladin, KambathIshq ,Goal, I hate love story, Tees Maar Khan, Sanghai,  Dabaang, Dirty Picture, Shirin Farhad Ki Nikal Padi , Agent Vinod, Ram Leela, Krish 3, Happy New Year, Bajirao Mastani. His upcoming project  as Music Producer is Hrithik Roshan Starrer Kaabil. Album THE MUSIC ROOM for Sonu Nigam & Bickram Ghosh, KAASH Album for Hariharan...
He has also been  part of an International Album with Rahul Sharma in collaboration with the world renowned  saxophonist Kenny G & Deep Forest. Vanjari has made his debut as a music composer along with Sandeep Shirodkar for an International project 'BIR BABA HINDU'  (Turkish film)  which was released on 29 September 2016

Filmography as Background Score Composer
 Yaadein (2001)
 Mehbooba (2008)
 Jahan Tum Le Chalo (1999)

Filmography as music producer (music arranger)
As music producer

 Border (1997)
 Chachi 420 (1997)
 Satya (film) (1998)
 Jahan Tum Le Chalo (1999)
 Hu Tu Tu (1999)
 Godmother (film) (1999)
 Aśoka (2001)
 Lajja (2001)
 Yaadein (2001)
 Om Jai Jagadish (2002)
 Awara Paagal Deewana (2002)
 Munna Bhai M.B.B.S. (2003)
 Karle Pyaar Karle (2003)
 Khushi (2003)
 Murder (2004)
 Ek Ajnabee (2004)
 Zeher (2005)
 Golmaal: Fun Unlimited (2006)
 Om Shanti Om (2007)
 Jab We Met (2007) Yeh Ishq Hai
 Dhol (2007)
 Cash (2007)
 Ta Ra Rum Pum (2007)
 Goal (2007)
 Tashan (2008)
 Dostana (2008)
 Ugly Aur Pagli (2008) Song Talli
 Aladin (2009)
 Kambakkht Ishq (2009)
 Kites (2010)
 Ishqiya (2010)
 Toonpur Ka Super Hero (2010)
 I Hate Luv Storys (2010)
 Tees Maar Khan (2010)
 Dabangg (2010) Munni Badnaam Hui Remix
 The Dirty Picture (2011)
 Rascals (2011)
 Shanghai (2012)
 Shirin Farhad Ki Toh Nikal Padi (2012)
 Agent Vinod (2012)
 Goliyon Ki Raasleela Ram-Leela (2013)
 Krrish 3 (2013)
 Chennai Express (2013) Title Song
 Happy New Year (2014)
 Dishkiyaoon (2014)
 Brahma (2014) Ting Ting (Kannada)
 Bajirao Mastani (2015)
 Uppi 2 (2015) No Excuse me please (Kannada)
 Hey Bro (2015)
 Ishq Forever (2016)
 Hello Naan Pei Pesuren (Tamil) (2016)
 Kaabil (2017)
 Tiger Zinda Hai (2017)  Dil Diyan Gallan
 Padmaavat (2018)  Binte Dil
 Ayushman Bhava (2019) Sara Sara (Kannada)
 Malaal (2019) Udhaal, Aila re, Katthai Katthai 
 Dream Girl (2019) Radhe Radhe 
 Gharga (2020) Bhangi Sediro (Kannada)
 Chehre (2021) Title Track
 Gangubai Kathiawadi (2022) Meri Jaan  

Filmography as music composer
As Music Composer
 Bir baba hindu'' (2016) (Turkey, Istanbul)

References

External links
 https://www.imdb.com/name/nm1576884/
 http://www.hungama.com/artists/jackie-vanjari/4344678
 https://www.instantbollywood.com/jackie-vanjari.html
 https://www.facebook.com/jackie.vanjari
 https://www.youtube.com/channel/UCXXh1aq_kHD4Dkre0uw--yg

Indian film score composers
Musicians from Mumbai
Indian male film score composers
Living people
Year of birth missing (living people)